Matthew Owen Jackson is  the William D. Eberle Professor of Economics at Stanford University, an external faculty member of the Santa Fe Institute, and a fellow of CIFAR.  

Jackson's research concerns game theory, microeconomic theory, and the study of social and economic networks. Jackson was one of the founders of the study of networks in economics. His work has analyzed the formation of networks and the sources and effects of homophily in social relationships. He has also made important contributions to the study of how networks mediate access to jobs and information as well as the contagion of financial distress.

He received his Ph.D. from Stanford University in 1988, and has taught at Northwestern University and the California Institute of Technology. 

He has served as co-editor of Games and Economic Behavior, the Review of Economic Design, and Econometrica. Jackson co-teaches a popular game theory course on Coursera.org, along with Kevin Leyton-Brown and Yoav Shoham.

Jackson has been honored with the Social Choice and Welfare Prize, the B.E.Press Arrow Prize for Senior Economists, and a Guggenheim Fellowship. He has been elected to the National Academy of Sciences, the American Academy of Arts and Sciences, and is a Fellow of the Econometric Society. For 2021 he was awarded the BBVA Foundation Frontiers of Knowledge Award in Economics, Finance and Management.

Selected publications

References

External links 
  Jackson's home page at Stanford University

1962 births
Living people
Stanford University Department of Economics faculty
Game theorists
20th-century American economists
21st-century American economists
Fellows of the Econometric Society
Santa Fe Institute people
Fellows of the American Academy of Arts and Sciences
Nancy L. Schwartz Memorial Lecture speakers
Network scientists